Stejneger's leaf-toed gecko (Hemidactylus stejnegeri) is a species of lizard in the family Gekkonidae. The species is native to Southeast Asia.

Etymology
The specific name, stejnegeri, is in honour of Norwegian-American herpetologist Leonhard Stejneger.

Geographic range
H. stejnegeri is found in the Philippines, Taiwan, and Vietnam.

Habitat

Reproduction
H. stejnegeri is an oviparous, triploid, parthenogenetic species.

References

Further reading
Ota H, Hikida T (1989). "A New Triploid Hemidactylus (Gekkonidae: Sauria) from Taiwan, with Comments on Morphological and Karyological Variation in the H. garnotii-vietnamensis Complex". Journal of Herpetology 23 (1): 50–60. (Hemidactylus stejnegeri, new species).
Nguyen SV, Ho CT, Nguyen TQ (2009). Herpetofauna of Vietnam. Frankfurt am Main: Chimaira / Serpents Tale. 768 pp. .
Rösler H (2000). "Kommentierte Liste der rezent, subrezent und fossil bekannten Geckotaxa (Reptilia: Gekkonomorpha)". Gekkota 2: 28–153. (Hemidactylus stejnegeri, p. 87). (in German).

Hemidactylus
Reptiles described in 1989
Reptiles of the Philippines
Reptiles of Taiwan
Reptiles of Vietnam